Maura Penders is an American television soap opera writer.

Positions held
Another World
 Associate Head Writer (1998– June 25, 1999)
 Script Writer (1998)

Days of Our Lives (hired by Anne Howard Bailey, then by Tom Langan)
 Associate Head Writer (1989–1997, 2000–2002)
 Occasional Script Writer (1989–1997, 2000–2002)

Guiding Light
Associate Writer (2000)

Port Charles
Associate Head Writer (1997)

Ryan's Hope
Script Writer (1984–1986)

Awards and nominations
Daytime Emmy Award
Nomination, 1994 and 1997, Best Writing, Days of our Lives

Writers Guild of America Award
Nomination, 1991 and 1993, Best Writing, Days of our Lives
Nomination, 1986, Best Writing, Ryan's Hope

External links

American soap opera writers
Living people
Year of birth missing (living people)